Jason Torrens (born 20 May 1975  in Melbourne) is an Australian actor and musician.

Torrens is best known for his role as Peter Unwin George Wall ("Pugwall") in the 1989 children's television series Pugwall. Other notable roles include Dillon Renshaw in Neighbours in 1996 and Duncan in Newlyweds in 1993.

Torrens was a founding member of middle eastern surf band The Reefers, and is the drummer in Melbourne heavy rock act Bugdust.

Torrens is currently the Head of Audio Engineering at the Australian College of the Arts.

References

External links

1975 births
Australian male television actors
Australian male child actors
Living people
Male actors from Melbourne
Australian drummers
Male drummers
21st-century drummers
21st-century Australian male musicians
21st-century Australian musicians